Dimeriella sacchari is a species of fungus in the family Parodiopsidaceae. It is a plant pathogen that causes red leaf spot (also known as purple spot) on sugarcane.

References

Fungal plant pathogens and diseases
Sugarcane diseases
Dothideomycetes enigmatic taxa
Fungi described in 1892